John Robert Boone (commonly known as Johnny Boone) is an American farmer, who was a former leader of the Cornbread Mafia in the 1980s, one of the largest domestic marijuana syndicates in American history. He has been referred to as the "Godfather of Grass".

Biography
Boone was born in Washington County, Kentucky. He was raised by his grandfather who was a farmer and bootlegger. Boone won state 4-H titles in high school for both sheep breeding and tobacco growing. He was a three-time football letterman and graduated in 1961. Boone did not go to college and instead started a family and became a farmer. By the 1970s, Boone was cultivating what was said to be the best breed of pot in Kentucky, labeled "Kentucky Bluegrass" by High Times.

In the 1980s, Boone was a leader in the Cornbread Mafia, a drug organization in Kentucky dubbed the "largest domestic marijuana syndicate in American history". During his time in the organization, he helped set up marijuana farms in his home state of Kentucky as well as surrounding states in the Midwest including Indiana, Illinois, and Kansas. He was arrested in 1987 as the ringleader of the organization and sentenced to 20 years in prison.  

In June 2008, police discovered Boone growing 2,421 marijuana seedlings on his farm outside Springfield, Kentucky in Washington County, but Boone escaped arrest, under threat of a life sentence without parole because the bust would be his third federal conviction under the Three Strikes Law. Boone became a fugitive and the subject of a segment of America's Most Wanted. On Dec. 22, 2016, after eight years on the run, Johnny Boone was arrested in a small town outside Montreal. Boone was later sentenced to fifty-seven months in prison.

Legacy
Boone has previously admitted to his wrongdoings and been quoted as saying, "we’re from a poor place … I don’t think anybody here is into any kind of thievery. I can only say that … in our area, marijuana is one of the things that helps put bread on the table for people." He was also known as being humble and taking care of his community in Marion and Washington Counties, Kentucky. During an eight year period when he was on the run, U.S. Marshals were unable to get information from people on his whereabouts, being told by residents they wouldn't tell his location even if they knew.

References 

American people convicted of drug offenses
20th-century American farmers
Living people
Year of birth missing (living people)
People convicted of cannabis offenses
21st-century American farmers